Durmeshqan (also Romanized as Dūrmeshqān and Dūrmoshqān; also known as Darmeshkān, Domoshqān, Dor Meshkān, Dormoshkān, and Durmushkha) is a village in Ijrud-e Bala Rural District, in the Central District of Ijrud County, Zanjan Province, Iran. At the 2006 census, its population was 46, in 8 families.

References 

Populated places in Ijrud County